Wortley is a village and civil parish in the Metropolitan Borough of Barnsley, South Yorkshire, England.  At the 2001 census it had a population of 579, increasing to 626 at the 2011 Census.  Wortley is mentioned in the 1086 Domesday Book as Wirtleie.

Wortley grew up as a settlement where the Sheffield to Halifax road crossed the Cheshire to Rotherham route.  In 1250, a Sunday market was briefly established, but this was quickly suppressed by the monks who owned the right to hold markets in Barnsley.  In 1307, the village finally received a Royal Charter to hold a weekly Thursday market and an annual three-day fair at Whitsun.  The market and fair both soon ceased, and an eighteenth-century attempt to revive the fair was unsuccessful.

The parish church of St. Leonard's dates back to the medieval period, being rebuilt during the 18th century.

The village is famous for the Wortley Top Forge, which dates back to the time of the Industrial Revolution, but is most famous for the notorious highwayman Swift Nick (John Nevison, 1639 - 1684) who was born and raised there. It was really he (and not Dick Turpin) who made the infamous ride on horseback from London to York in order to establish an alibi for a robbery. Wharncliffe House, Wortley, was home of the Earl of Wharncliffe until his death in 1987.

Wortley is home to Wortley Mens Club, the winner of the campaign for real ales (CAMRA) club of the year 2014 for the entire Yorkshire region and subsequent super regional winner for the North East, making it one of the best 4 Clubs in the UK. It has now been voted the best club in Britain by CAMRA for 2015 beating 28,000 other entrants. It hosts a variety of events including an annual charity beer festival held on or around 1 August every year to coincide with Yorkshire day.

Located in Wortley is Wortley Hall, a Grade II listed building since 1990. The parish contains the hamlet of Bromley.

Notable persons 
Wortley was the birthplace of the late Sergeant Ian McKay VC of the Parachute Regiment, awarded a posthumous Victoria Cross as a result of his actions during the Falklands War, the last action to be recognised by a Victoria Cross in the 20th century.

See also
Listed buildings in Wortley, South Yorkshire

References

External links

 
Villages in South Yorkshire
Geography of the Metropolitan Borough of Barnsley
Civil parishes in South Yorkshire